The 1995 470-European-Sailing-Championship was held between June 8 and 17 1995. It was discharged before Bastad, Sweden.

And was extended in both a women's and a men's competition 470-boat class, in which at the men the Britains Merricks / Walker and among women the Ukrainians Taran / Pakholchyk after twelve races the European title won.

Results

Men

Women

References 
 Official results men at  Website of International 470 Class Association
 Official results women at Website of International 470 Class Association

470 European Championships
1995 in sailing
1995 in Swedish sport
Sailing competitions in Sweden